Marc Morris (born 1973) is a British historian, who has also presented a television series, Castle, on Channel 4 in the United Kingdom, and wrote the book that accompanied the series. His 2005 book on the earls of the Bigod family was praised for its "impeccable research and fluent sense of narration".

He was educated at Oakwood Park Grammar School, King's College London (History, 1996) and the University of Oxford.

Bibliography
 Castle: A History of the Buildings that Shaped Medieval Britain (2003)
 The Bigod Earls of Norfolk in the Thirteenth Century (2005)
 A Great and Terrible King: Edward I and the Forging of Britain (2008)
 The Norman Conquest: The Battle of Hastings and the Fall of Anglo-Saxon England (2012)
 Kings and Castles (2012)
 King John: Treachery, Tyranny and the Road to Magna Carta (2015)
 William I: England's Conqueror (2016)
 The Anglo-Saxons: A History of the Beginnings of England (2021)

References

External links
 Official website

1973 births
Living people
Place of birth missing (living people)
Alumni of King's College London
Alumni of the University of Oxford
English historians
21st-century American politicians